Justice Coffey may refer to:

John Louis Coffey (1922-2012), associate justice of the Wisconsin Supreme Court
Silas Coffey (1839-1904), associate justice of the Supreme Court of Indiana